André Plassart (24 August 1889 – 13 May 1978) was a 20th-century French hellenist, epigrapher and archaeologist.

Selected bibliography 
 .
 .
 
 .
 .
 .

Studies on Plassart 
.
 .

External links 
 André Plassart on data.bnf.fr
 Plassart, André, Exploration Archéologique de Délos

French epigraphers
French hellenists
20th-century French historians
École Normale Supérieure alumni
1889 births
Writers from Chartres
1978 deaths
20th-century French archaeologists